Gamboula Airport  is an airstrip serving Gamboula, a town in the Mambéré-Kadéï prefecture of the Central African Republic.

See also

Transport in the Central African Republic
List of airports in the Central African Republic

References

External links 
OpenStreetMap - Gamboula
OurAirports - Gamboula Airport

Airports in the Central African Republic
Buildings and structures in Mambéré-Kadéï